Muiz ud din Qaiqabad (1269 – 1 February 1290, reigned 1287–1290) was the tenth sultan of the Mamluk dynasty (Slave dynasty). He was the son of Bughra Khan the Independent sultan of Bengal, as well as grandson of Ghiyas ud din Balban (1266–1287).

Historical background 
After the death of his son Muhammad Khan, in 1286 at the hands of the Mongols during the Battle of Beas River, Ghiyas ud din Balban was in an unrecoverable state of shock. In his last days he called his son Bughra Khan, who was then the Governor of Bengal, to stay with him, but due to the stern nature of his father he slipped away to Bengal. Eventually, Balban chose his grandson and son of Muhammad, Kay Khusroe, to be his successor. However, when Balban died, Fakhr-ud-Din, the Kotwal of Delhi, set aside the nomination and chose for Muiz ud din Qaiqabad, son of Bughra Khan, to become ruler instead, although he was only 17 years old.

Reign
After he became the Sultan, he indulged in the life of wine and women, the example set by the Sultan was also followed by his courtiers. He was not as much a pious Muslim as his predecessors as he did not focus on his Islamic studies as much. His army met with his father Bughra Khan's Bengal army in Northern Bihar, but due to the love for his father he ran towards him to embrace his crying. No battle took place and a lasting peace treaty was agreed between Bengal and Hindustan, which was even respected by his successors. On his return to Delhi, he transferred Nizam-ud-Din to Multan, seeing the latter's hesitation, the Sultan ordered him to be poisoned. He appointed Jalal-ud-din Khalji as a new commander of the army, but the murder and appointment sent a wave of dissent amongst the Turkic nobility. Taking advantage of this Jalal-ud-Din Firuz marched his army to Delhi.

After four years, he was murdered in 1290 by a Khalji noble. His infant son, Kayumars, was also murdered, ending the Mamluk Dynasty and instigating the Khalji Revolution.

Coinage 
Muiz ud din Qaiqabad struck coins in gold, silver, copper and billon. He struck many coins from Delhi and Lucknow.

Related Links
Mamluk dynasty of Delhi
Delhi Sultanate
Islamic history
List of Indian monarchs

References

External links
India Through the Ages
The Slave Dynasty
Coin database of Mu'izz ud-Din Qaiqabad

Sultans of the Mamluk dynasty (Delhi)
1290 deaths
Indian Sunni Muslims
13th-century Indian monarchs
Year of birth unknown
13th century in India